ISO 11783, known as Tractors and machinery for agriculture and forestry—Serial control and communications data network (commonly referred to as "ISO Bus" or "ISOBUS") is a communication protocol for the agriculture industry based on the SAE J1939 protocol (which includes CANbus) .

It is managed by the ISOBUS group in VDMA.

The ISOBUS standard specifies a serial data network for control and communications on forestry or agricultural tractors and implements.

Parts

The standard comes in 14 parts:

ISO 11783-1:  General standard for mobile data communication
ISO 11783-2:  Physical layer
ISO 11783-3:  Data link layer
ISO 11783-4:  Network layer
ISO 11783-5:  Network management
ISO 11783-6:  Virtual terminal
ISO 11783-7:  Implement messages application layer
ISO 11783-8:  Power train messages
ISO 11783-9:  Tractor ECU
ISO 11783-10: Task controller and management information system data interchange
ISO 11783-11: Mobile data element dictionary
ISO 11783-12: Diagnostics services
ISO 11783-13: File server
ISO 11783-14: Sequence control

Agricultural Industry Electronics Foundation and ISOBUS
The Agricultural Industry Electronics Foundation works to promote ISOBUS and coordinate enhanced certification tests for the ISO 11783 standard.

External links

ISO 11783-1:2017
Official VDMA page for ISOBUS
Open-source PoolEdit editor for creating ISOBUS user interfaces

11783
Network protocols